George Mu (born 1943 San Francisco) is an American Career Foreign Service Officer who served as the American Ambassador Extraordinary and Plenipotentiary to Côte d’Ivoire (1998-2001). Mu is the first Commercial Service Officer to become an Ambassador.  He was appointed to the rank of Career Minister in 1992, becoming the highest ranking Foreign Service Officer in the Commercial Service.

Mu graduated from the University of California, Berkeley.

References

Living people
1943 births
Date of birth missing (living people)
People from San Francisco
Ambassadors of the United States to Ivory Coast
20th-century American diplomats
University of California, Berkeley alumni
United States Foreign Service personnel